Kevin Smith (30 November 1934 – 22 June 2018) was an Australian rules footballer who played with Footscray in the Victorian Football League (VFL).		
		
In 1955, Kevin R. Smith was transferred to Footscray from North Melbourne, and the two men with the same name played together in two games.

Notes

External links 
		

1934 births
2018 deaths
Australian rules footballers from Victoria (Australia)
Western Bulldogs players
Eaglehawk Football Club players